The Men's club throw (category B) was one of the events held in Athletics at the 1960 Summer Paralympics in Rome.

There were only three competitors; all three therefore won a medal. France's Barbier (full name not recorded) achieved a throw of 38.24m, taking a clear lead for gold.

References 

Club
1960